Herbert Leney (8 September 1850 – 18 November 1915) was an English amateur cricketer who played in four first-class cricket matches for Kent County Cricket Club between 1871 and 1878.

Leney was born at Wateringbury near Maidstone in Kent in 1850. He made his first-class debut for Kent against WG Grace's XI in 1873 at Gravesend. He died at Smith's Hall at West Farleigh in Kent in November 1915 aged 65. His nephew, Frederick Leney, also played first-class cricket.

References

External links

1850 births
1915 deaths
People from Wateringbury
English cricketers
Kent cricketers
People from West Farleigh